The 1998–99 Red Stripe Bowl was the 25th season of what is now the Regional Super50, the domestic limited-overs cricket competition for the countries of the West Indies Cricket Board (WICB). It ran from 6 to 19 October 1998.

Eight teams contested the competition – the six regular teams of West Indian domestic cricket (Barbados, Guyana, Jamaica, the Leeward Islands, Trinidad and Tobago, and the Windward Islands), plus two invited international teams from the ICC Americas region (Bermuda and the United States). All matches at the tournament were held in either Guyana or Jamaica, with the semi-finals and final held in the latter country, in Discovery Bay. Guyana and the Leeward Islands eventually progressed to the final, with Guyana winning by 52 runs to claim their sixth domestic one-day title. Guyanese batsman Shivnarine Chanderpaul led the tournament in runs, while Dinanath Ramnarine of Trinidad and Tobago and Anthony Lake of the Leeward Islands were the joint leading wicket-takers.

Squads

Group stage

Zone A

Zone B

Finals

Semi-finals

Final

Statistics

Most runs
The top five run scorers (total runs) are included in this table.

Source: CricketArchive

Most wickets

The top five wicket takers are listed in this table, listed by wickets taken and then by bowling average.

Source: CricketArchive

References

1999 in West Indian cricket
West Indian cricket seasons from 1970–71 to 1999–2000
Regional Super50 seasons
Domestic cricket competitions in 1998–99